Maureen Cusack (24 November 1920 – 18 December 1977) was an Irish actress. She was born in 1920 in Glenties, County Donegal, Ireland as Mary Margaret Kiely. She was married to Irish actor Cyril Cusack and they had five children Sinéad, Sorcha, Niamh, Paul and Pádraig. Sinéad, Sorcha and Niamh are all actresses and Pádraig is a theatre producer. Her grandsons are actors Max Irons and Calam Lynch, and the politician Richard Boyd Barrett. Her granddaughter is the actress Megan Cusack.

She was a leading actress at Dublin's Gate Theatre with transfers to London's West End in the late 1940s, she also was part of the Abbey Theatre Dublin in 1948 as a visiting company member with The Lyric Theatre Company where she appeared in The Viscount of Blarney in1948. In 1946 she appeared in a Radio Eireann production of a play by Irish playwright Teresa Deevy called Katie Roche and again in 1947 in Wife to James Whelan, these were both produced by Gabriel Fallon.

She is best known for her roles in Odd Man Out (1947), The Rising of the Moon (1957), Von Richthofen and Brown (1971), also The Loves of Cass Maguire (1975), and Playboy of the Western World (1946).

She died on 18 December 1977, in Dublin and is buried in Saint Fintan's Cemetery, Sutton, County Dublin, Ireland.

Filmography 

Playboy of the Western World (1946)
Odd Man Out (1947)
The Rising of the Moon (1957)
Von Richthofen and Brown (The Red Baron) (1971)
The Loves of Cass Maguire (1975)

Theatrical work 

The Barrel Organ (1942) – Robert Collis
Assembly at Druim Ceat (1943) – Roibeárd Ó Faracháin
The Kiss (1944) – Austin Clarke
The Viscount of Blarney (1944) – Austin Clarke
Katie Roche (1946) – Teresa Deevy
The Second Kiss (1946) - Austin Clarke
Ill Met by Moonlight (1946) - Micheál MacLiammóir, followed by transfer to London's West End (1947)
Wife to James Whelan (1947) – Teresa Deevy
Home for Christmas (1950) - Micheál MacLiammóir
Arms and the Man (1951) - George Bernard Shaw 
A Slipper for the Moon (1954) - Micheál MacLiammóir
The Playboy of the Western World (1955) - John Millington Synge
The Bishop's Bonfire (1955) - Seán O'Casey
 Androcles and the Lion (1956) - George Bernard Shaw
The Rising of the Moon (1956) - Lady Gregory
Roger Casement (1958) - Roger McHugh
''The Temptation of Mr O (1961) - Franz Kafka adapted for the stage by Cyril Cusack

References

External links 
 
Maureen Cusack at The Abbey Theatre
Maureen Cusack at the Teresa Deevy Archive
Maureen Cusack at Radio Eireann

1920 births
1977 deaths
20th-century Irish actresses
Actresses from County Donegal
Irish expatriates in the United Kingdom
Irish film actresses
Irish stage actresses